John Madden (1936–2021) was an American football coach and television announcer.

John Madden may also refer to:

Government
John Madden (judge) (1844–1918), Australian judge and politician
John Madden (Tasmanian politician) (1896–1971), Australian politician
John Madden (Irish politician) ( 1895–1954), Irish politician

Sports
John Madden (hurler) (born 1968), Irish hurling selector and player
John Madden (ice hockey) (born 1973), Canadian ice hockey player
John E. Madden (1856–1929), American horse trainer and thoroughbred breeder
Jack Madden, Canadian basketball referee
Johnny Madden (John William Madden, 1865–1948), Scottish footballer and football manager

Others
John Danny Madden, American singer, often abbreviated as Danny Madden
John Madden (director) (born 1949), English director of theatre, film, television, and radio
John Thomas Madden (1882–1948), American educator and business leader 
John Madden (priest) (died 1751), Irish Dean of Kilmore
Johnathon Robert Madden (1991–2003), Canadian child murder victim

See also
John Madin (1924–2012), English architect